Emanuel Lasker faced David Janowski in the second 1910 World Chess Championship. The second of two Championship matches played in 1910 was contested from November 8 to December 8, 1910 in Berlin, Lasker successfully defending his title. In terms of the score (8 wins to Lasker, 0 wins to Janowski, 3 draws) it was the most one-sided World Chess Championship match in history.

Background

Lasker and Janowski played two exhibition matches in 1909, the first drawn (+2 -2) and the second won convincingly by Lasker (+7 =2 -1). The longer 1909 match has sometimes been called a world championship match, but research by Edward Winter indicates that the title was not at stake.

Results

The first player to win eight games would be World Champion.

{| class="wikitable" style="text-align:center"
|+World Chess Championship Match Nov-Dec 1910
|-
! !! 1 !! 2 !! 3 !! 4 !! 5 !! 6 !! 7 !! 8 !! 9 !! 10  !! 11 !! Wins !! Total
|-
| align=left | 
| 1 ||style="background:black; color:white"| = || = ||style="background:black; color:white"| 1 || 1 ||style="background:black; color:white"| = || 1 ||style="background:black; color:white"| 1 || 1 ||style="background:black; color:white"| 1 || 1 || 8 || 9½
|-
| align=left | 
|style="background:black; color:white"| 0 || = ||style="background:black; color:white"| = || 0 ||style="background:black; color:white"| 0 || = ||style="background:black; color:white"| 0 || 0 ||style="background:black; color:white"| 0 || 0 ||style="background:black; color:white"| 0 || 0 || 1½
|}

Lasker retained the title in the most one-sided World Championship of all time.

Notes

External links
1910 World Chess Championship at the Internet Archive record of Graeme Cree's Chess Pages

1910 2
1910 in chess
1910 in German sport
Chess in Germany
Sports competitions in Berlin
1910s in Berlin